Cybernetics and Systems is a peer-reviewed scientific journal of cybernetics and systems science, including artificial intelligence, computer science, cybernetics, human computer intelligence, information and communication technology, machine learning, and robotics. The journal was established in 1971 as Journal of Cybernetics and obtained its current title in 1980. It is published by Taylor & Francis in cooperation with the Austrian Society for Cybernetic Studies and the editor-in-chief is Robert Trappl.

Abstracting and indexing 
Cybernetics and Systems is abstracted and indexed in:

According to the Journal Citation Reports, the journal has a 2016 impact factor of 1.434, ranking it 12th out of 22 journals in the category "Computer Science, Cybernetics"

References

External links 
 

Cybernetics
Publications established in 1971
Taylor & Francis academic journals
English-language journals